René Faye (20 December 1923 – 8 January 1994) was a French cyclist. He was born in Champagnac-la-Rivière. He won a bronze medal in the tandem event at the 1948 Summer Olympics in London, together with Gaston Dron.

References

External links
 
 
 

1923 births
1994 deaths
Sportspeople from Haute-Vienne
French male cyclists
Cyclists at the 1948 Summer Olympics
Olympic cyclists of France
Olympic bronze medalists for France
Olympic medalists in cycling
Medalists at the 1948 Summer Olympics
Cyclists from Nouvelle-Aquitaine